The Russian Tea Room is an Art Deco Russo-Continental restaurant, located at 150 West 57th Street (between Sixth Avenue and Seventh Avenue), between Carnegie Hall Tower and Metropolitan Tower, in the New York City borough of Manhattan.

History
The Russian Tea Room was opened in 1927, by former members of the Russian Imperial Ballet, as a gathering place for Russian expatriates and became famous as a gathering place for those in the entertainment industry. At the time of its opening, the restaurant mostly served tea and catered to Russian artists, particularly ballet dancers. The founder is often considered to be Polish-born Jacob Zysman, but in that year, a corporation directory lists Albertina Rasch as the president, and her name appears along with Russian Art Chocolate and Russian Tea Room, in early photographs of the shopfront at 145 West 57th Street.

In 1929, the business moved across the street to its present location, which at that time was an Italianate brownstone, built in 1875 by German immigrant John F. Pupke, a tea and coffee merchant, whose son later moved the large clan to Long Island, seeking a more relaxed lifestyle. By 1933, the Siberian émigré Alexander Maeef was running the Russian Tea Room and was the main personality associated with the restaurant for the next fifteen years.

A group of investors took over the Russian Tea Room in the 1940s. In 1955, the restaurant was purchased by Sidney Kaye, who acquired his partners' stakes. The Russian Tea Room's clientele originally consisted largely of musical personalities. After the New York Philharmonic moved from Carnegie Hall to Lincoln Center, Kaye declined an invitation to relocate his restaurant to Lincoln Center. As such, the restaurant began to serve theatrical and film personalities, publishers, journalists, fashion designers, and artists. The Russian Tea Room was long advertised as "just six minutes and 23 seconds from Lincoln Center and slightly to the left of Carnegie Hall" because of its proximity to both venues. When Kaye died in 1967 at the age of 53, he left the restaurant to his widow, Faith Stewart-Gordon.

Late 20th century 

In 1981, Harry B. Macklowe, the developer of Metropolitan Tower immediately to the east, planned a large office tower that would have included the sites of the current Metropolitan Tower, Russian Tea Room, and Carnegie Hall Tower immediately to the west. Macklowe had offered Stewart-Gordon $12.5 million for the building's air rights in 1982. However, Stewart-Gordon refused several offers to acquire her building, so Macklowe withdrew his bid for the Carnegie Hall Tower site in 1983. Though Stewart-Gordon subsequently considered selling the restaurant building, she ended up not selling the building or its air rights to Carnegie Hall Tower's developers.

The Russian Tea Room began hosting cabaret performances in the mid-1990s, hosting performers such as Karen Akers, Andrea Marcovicci, Steve Ross, and Margaret Whiting during its first season. Warner LeRoy, who owned Tavern on the Green, bought the restaurant from Stewart-Gordon in June 1995 for $6.5 million. LeRoy shortly announced plans to renovate the restaurant. LeRoy hired David Bouley as the Russian Tea Room's executive chef in October 1995. 

The restaurant closed for renovation on December 31, 1995. LeRoy had planned to replace the existing restaurant with a new structure costing $12 million. He hired the firm of Harman Jablin to design a seven-story structure designed in a Russian eclectic style, with features such as a large acrylic Russian bear and a replica of the Kremlin. The new structure would have contained a formal second-floor dining room, as well as banquet rooms on the third and fourth floors. Dishes, furniture, paintings, samovars, and upholstery from the restaurant were sold at auction in January 1996. Rumors circulated that LeRoy's declining health, impending divorce, and lack of funding had caused the restaurant's renovation to be delayed. By April 1997, the restaurant was scheduled to reopen in June 1998. Bouley quit in 1998 following a disagreement with LeRoy, and Fabrice Canelle was hired as the restaurant's new executive chef. The interior of the restaurant was demolished and rebuilt in late 1998.

Early 21st century 
The Russian Tea Room reopened in October 1999. It had cost $15 million to demolish the interior and more than $20 million to redecorate the restaurant. LeRoy indicated that the average customer would spend $45 on a meal; the cheapest items cost $20, and the Russian Tea Room did not enforce a formal dress code. By then, LeRoy's health was failing, and the local economy did not recover quickly enough to make payments on the substantial loans for the renovations.  The Russian Tea Room closed with little notice on July 28, 2002, after declaring bankruptcy. 

After Warner LeRoy died in 2001, his estate sold the property for $16 million to the United States Golf Association in December 2002. The Association had planned to reconfigure the property as a dining room and museum in which to showcase its extensive collection of golf memorabilia, but instead sold the building in 2004 to Sheila Vanderbilt's RTR Funding Group. The 20-foot-wide building extends from 57th Street (the restaurant's main entrance) to 56th Street. The plans were to replace some of the current building facing 56th Street with a 29-story condominium, which is to be designed by Costas Kondylis. The original restaurant would have been undisturbed.

The Russian Tea Room reopened on November 1, 2006. The restaurant's interior has not been touched, and the over-the-top decor is the same as when it closed in 2002.  However, several restaurant reviews have noted that the food and service leave significant room for improvement.

Design 
The restaurant building was originally four stories high.

During the 1990s renovation, the ground floor remained intact, but the upper stories were modified significantly. After the restaurant reopened in 1999, the first floor was designed in a similar manner to the original, with stag-head and firebird motifs; an ice sculpture was placed in the center. There was a bear-shaped revolving aquarium on the second floor. This story also contained green and red upholstery, a gold-painted tree with 35 glass eggs, and a Tiffany glass ceiling. The upper stories were decorated with a fireplace, bronze-painted domed ceilings, and blue walls. There was a double-height ballroom on the third floor and three private dining rooms on the fourth floor. The fourth story also contained a 3D model of troops in Moscow's Red Square,

Cuisine 
When the Russian Tea Room reopened in 1999, it primarily served Russian and Georgian cuisine. Among the dishes served were pelmeni, fish, and hot borscht; the restaurant also sold 250 types of wine.

Notable guests

Woody Allen
Rowan Atkinson
Anne Bancroft
Tallulah Bankhead
 Noel Behn
Victor Borge
Lucrezia Bori
Mel Brooks
Charles III
 Michael Douglas
Mischa Elman
Kirsten Flagstad
Ossip Gabrilowitsch
Jascha Heifetz
Dustin Hoffman
Wanda Toscanini Horowitz
Lou Jacobi
Jacqueline Kennedy Onassis
Henry Kissinger
Fritz Kreisler
Rudolf Nureyev
Sidney Poitier
Rosa Ponselle
Anthony Quayle
William Saroyan
Arthur Rubinstein
George Segal
Alan Schneider
Ringo Starr
Leopold Stokowski
Barbra Streisand
Richard Suskind
Peter Ustinov
Mitchell A. Wilson

Reception 
Bryan Miller of The New York Times said in 1992 that "beneath all the hype there is little substance", saying that the restaurant suffered from "inattentive and unprofessional" service despite being highly patronized. After the Russian Tea Room reopened in 1999, William Grimes of the Times wrote that the reopened restaurant was "appalling", saying: "More than ever, the Russian Tea Room is not about the food. [...] The modern touches that [Canelle] has introduced often seem peculiar, and the traditional dishes lack soul." Times food critic Frank Bruni regarded the Russian Tea Room as "good" in 2006, saying that "in terms of food and all else, the Russian Tea Room doesn't add up neatly or quite make sense", although the high quality of the food was counterbalanced by poor service.

In popular culture

Artworks
 It is depicted in a painting by Beryl Cook.

Notable employees and events
 British comedian Rowan Atkinson married Sunetra Sastry there in 1990, having met her there that year on February 5.
 In 1979, Madonna worked there, as a coat-check clerk.

Films
 Scenes from The Turning Point, Manhattan, Tootsie, When Harry Met Sally..., Big, Smurfs, Sweet Smell of Success, New York Stories, Unfaithfully Yours, and The Extra Man were filmed at the restaurant.

Literature
It is featured in Eve Babitz's Sex and Rage as a place where literary agents take authors out to lunch.
 It is mentioned in Jay McInerney's novel Bright Lights, Big City.

Television

"The One Where the Monkey Gets Away" and "The One With the Evil Orthodontist" episodes of Friends mentions it numerous times. 
"The Wrath of Con" episode of Gossip Girl was filmed there. 
The "Dad" episode of Louie was filmed there, and in season 3 Louie meets his Uncle Excelsior there for lunch
 In 1995, it was shown in The Nanny season 3 episode "Pen Pal". 
 It is used as a setting in the 2016-2017 season of Saturday Night Lives intro, introducing Aidy Bryant in the scene.
 In 2002, it was shown in the background of a scene in the season 1 episode "Tuxedo Hill" of Law & Order: Criminal Intent.

See also
 List of restaurants in New York City
 List of Russian restaurants

References

Further reading

External links

 Official website
 "Recreating the Sizzle, Going Easy on the Butter", The New York Times, October 22, 2006
 Fabricant, Florence, "Tea Room Coming Back", The New York Times, October 4, 2006
 "The Russian Tea Room: Sweet Deals Fail to Tempt", The New York Times, September 11, 1988

Restaurants in Manhattan
1927 establishments in New York City
Russian-American culture in New York City
Russian restaurants in the United States
Restaurants established in 1927
57th Street (Manhattan)
Midtown Manhattan